Obba rivulosa is a species of crust fungus in the family Gelatoporiaceae. It is found in the Caribbean, Europe, North America, and South America. Its genome sequence was reported in 2016.

References

Fungi described in 1869
Fungi of Europe
Fungi of North America
Fungi of South America
Fungi of the Caribbean
Gelatoporiaceae
Taxa named by Miles Joseph Berkeley